Mohamed Nassim Ousserir (born February 5, 1978 in Boufarik, Blida) is a retired Algerian footballer who played as a goalkeeper. Ousserir had 5 caps for the Algeria national football team and was part of Algeria's squad at the 2010 Africa Cup of Nations.

International career
Ousserir received his first cap for the Algerian National Team on April 24, 2003 in a 3-1 friendly win against Madagascar in Amiens, France.

He was a member of the team which finished fourth at the 2010 African Cup of Nations in Angola, but did not participate in any games.

Ousserir has 5 caps for the Algeria National Team and still receives regular call-ups.

National team statistics

References

External links
 
 

1978 births
Living people
People from Boufarik
Algerian footballers
Algeria international footballers
2010 Africa Cup of Nations players
NA Hussein Dey players
CR Belouizdad players
USM Blida players
Algerian Ligue Professionnelle 1 players
Algerian Ligue 2 players
RC Kouba players
MC El Eulma players
Olympique de Médéa players
Association football goalkeepers
21st-century Algerian people